Bernard W. Graham (February 10, 1863 October 30, 1886) was an American Major League Baseball player who played one season in the Union Association.  The Association lasted just one season, 1884, and Graham played one game for the Chicago Browns and 41 for the Baltimore Monumentals.  He batted .267 for the year, scored 23 runs, and hit 11 doubles.

Graham died at the age of 23 in Mobile, Alabama from typhoid fever, and is interred at Catholic Cemetery in Mobile / Catholic Cemetery, Beloit, Rock County, Wisconsin.

Death
Death notice taken from the Beloit Weekly Free Press, from November 11, 1886, page 3

The remains of Mr. Barney Graham arrived in the city Thursday from Mobile, Alabama.  Deceased was a professional baseball player in the South and died of a fever.  His parents live four miles west of the city and came to Wisconsin from the East about two years ago.  The remains will be buried in this city.

Grave

Rhode Island Birth Index, 1863.

Name:  Graham, Bernard;  Sex:  Male;  Birthdate:  02 10 63 [February 10, 1863];  Father:  Thomas;  Mother:  Rose;  Bk-Pg-Ct:  63-113-03.

References

External links
 

Baseball players from Wisconsin
19th-century baseball players
Major League Baseball outfielders
Chicago Browns/Pittsburgh Stogies players
Baltimore Monumentals players
Sportspeople from Beloit, Wisconsin
Deaths from typhoid fever
1863 births
1886 deaths
Worcester (minor league baseball) players
Memphis Reds players
Omaha Omahogs players
Keokuk Hawkeyes players
Mobile (minor league baseball) players
Chattanooga Lookouts players
Memphis Grays players
Catholics from Wisconsin